Straumen is the administrative centre of Sørfold Municipality in Nordland county, Norway. The village is located at the end of the Sørfolda fjord, along the European route E06 highway.

References

Sørfold
Villages in Nordland
Populated places of Arctic Norway